The 1989 World Wrestling Championships were held in Martigny, Switzerland.

Medal table

Team ranking

Medal summary

Men's freestyle

Men's Greco-Roman

Women's freestyle

References
FILA Database

World Wrestling Championships
W
W
W